Bryan Sewell Watson Jones (February 21, 1897 – March 6, 1981) was an American football coach. He was the second head football coach at Abilene Christian University in Abilene, Texas and he held that position for the 1920 season. His coaching record at Abilene Christian was 4–0–1.

Head coaching record

References

External links
 

1897 births
1981 deaths
Abilene Christian Wildcats football coaches
People from Roswell, New Mexico